"Back on My Mind Again" is a song “written” by Charles Quillen and Conrad Pierce, and recorded by American country music artist Ronnie Milsap.  It was released in December 1978 as the third single from his album Only One Love in My Life. The song reached number 2 on the Billboard Hot Country Singles chart.

The b-side "Santa Barbara", written by Hal David and Archie Jordan, also charted.

Chart performance
Back on My Mind Again

Santa Barbara

Year-end charts

References

1979 singles
1978 songs
Ronnie Milsap songs
RCA Records singles
Songs written by Charles Quillen
Song recordings produced by Tom Collins (record producer)